Altındere may refer to:

Surname
 Halil Altındere (born 1971), Turkish contemporary artist
 Hasret Altındere (born 1980), Turkish women's footballer

Places
 Altındere, Sason, a village in Sason district of Batman Province, Turkey
 Altındere Valley National Park, a national park in Maçka district of Trabzon Province, Turkey